Buchach castle is a ruin of a medieval castle, located in Buchach, Ternopil Oblast, Ukraine. It was built by the Buchacki family in the 14-15th century at around the time the town was founded. It was rebuilt by the Potocki-Movile family in the 16-17th century in a Renaissance style. It was a defensive structure, and saw combat several times. It fell into disrepair following its destruction by the Ottomans in the late 17th century. During the 19th century, while under the Austrian partition, it was partially demolished to reclaim building material. Today, it is a tourist attraction open to visitors.

References

Bibliography
Stanisław Sławomir Nicieja, Twierdze kresowe Rzeczypospolitej, Wydawnictwo Iskry, Warszawa, 2006, p. 35–46, 

castle
Ruined castles in Ukraine
Castles in Ternopil Oblast
Buchach